The 1934 Women's Western Open was a golf competition held at Portland Golf Club, the 5th edition of the event. Marian McDougall won the championship in match play competition by defeating Mrs. Guy Riegel in the final match, 9 and 7.

Women's Western Open
Golf in Oregon
Women's Western Open
Women's Western Open
Women's Western Open
Women's sports in Oregon